Signe Livbjerg (21 February 1980) is a Danish sailor. She won the bronze medal in the 2004 Summer Olympics in Athens  in the Europe class.

References

1980 births
Olympic sailors of Denmark
Danish female sailors (sport)
Sailors at the 2004 Summer Olympics – Europe
Olympic bronze medalists for Denmark
Olympic medalists in sailing
Living people
Medalists at the 2004 Summer Olympics